MZH or mzh may refer to:

 MZH, the IATA code for Amasya Merzifon Airport, Turkey
 MZH, the National Rail station code for Maze Hill railway station, London
 MZH, the Pinyin code for Mengzhuang railway station, Zhengzhou, Henan, China
 mzh, the ISO 639-3 code for Wichí Lhamtés Güisnay, Argentina